Former Residence of Soong Ching-ling or Soong Ching-ling Memorial Residence may refer to:

Former Residence of Soong Ching-ling (Beijing)
Soong Ching-ling Memorial Residence (Shanghai)

Soong Ching-ling